Lens fiber major intrinsic protein also known as aquaporin-0 is a protein that in humans is encoded by the MIP gene.

Function 

Major intrinsic protein is a member of the water-transporting aquaporins as well as the original member of the MIP family of channel proteins. The function of the fiber cell membrane protein encoded by this gene is undetermined, yet this protein is speculated to play a role in intracellular communication. The MIP protein is expressed in the ocular lens and is required for correct lens function. This gene has been mapped among aquaporins AQP2, AQP5, and AQP6, in a potential gene cluster at 12q13.

References

Further reading